Bun Friend is reggae, dancehall artist Capleton's sixteenth studio album. It was released on June 10, 2008. The album is a mix of dancehall and reggae, with hit singles such as "Yo Betta Than" and "Bun Friend".

Track listing

2008 albums
Capleton albums